is a Japanese former competitive figure skater. He won two 1999–2000 ISU Junior Grand Prix (JGP) events and the 2001 Japanese junior national title. He qualified for the 1999–2000 JGP Final, where he finished fourth, and reached the top ten at two ISU Championships, placing 6th at 1999 Junior Worlds in Zagreb and 8th at 2000 Junior Worlds in Oberstdorf.

Tanaka was cut from the 2001 World Junior Championships in Sofia after placing 16th in his qualifying group. After retiring from competition, he skated professionally in ice shows.

Programs

Competitive highlights 
JGP: Junior Grand Prix

References

External links
 

Japanese male single skaters
1982 births
Living people
Sportspeople from Miyagi Prefecture